The 1989–90 Combined Counties Football League season was the 12th in the history of the Combined Counties Football League, a football competition in England.

The league was won by Chipstead for the first time.

League table

The league was reduced to 18 clubs from 19 after Malden Vale were promoted to the Isthmian League, and no new clubs joined:

British Aerospace (Weybridge) changed their name to Weybridge Town.

References

External links
 Combined Counties League Official Site

1989-90
1989–90 in English football leagues